Lissacresig  is a ringfort (rath) and National Monument (#571) located in County Cork, Ireland.

Location

Lissacresig is located 6.7 km west-northwest of Macroom, in the hills between the River Sullane and River Foherish.

History and description
Lissacresig is a circular lios,  in diameter with entrances in the southwest and northeast corners. The name means "ringfort of the glutton." Ringforts of this type were mostly built c. AD 550–900. Internally people were housed in wooden huts. Another fort lies 900 m to the northwest; this may have served as a livestock enclosure. There are three monoliths (gallauns) and an axial stone circle in the area as well. The stone circle is formed of five large boulders; unusually, the axial stone is the longest.

References

Archaeological sites in County Cork
National Monuments in County Cork